Color consciousness is a theory stating that equality under the law is insufficient to address racial inequalities in society. It rejects the concept of fundamental racial differences, but holds that physical differences such as skin color can and do negatively impact some people's life opportunities.  Supreme Court Justice Harry Blackmun in 1978, stated, "In order to get beyond racism, we must first take account of race. There is no other way. And in order to treat some persons equally, we must treat them differently." (Regents of the University of California v. Bakke).

19th century
David R. Roediger in his book Wages of Whiteness, draws a distinction between black and white wage workers in the 19th century: 

This distinction between free black and white wage workers shows a kind of negative color consciousness, in which the white "help" insists on being recognized as a white person, since she is therefore higher in the social hierarchy, even though she is employed as an unskilled laborer. This contrasts with modern notions of positive color consciousness, through such endeavors as affirmative action, to bolster those that had been disadvantaged due to their race.

See also
 Color blindness (race)
 Race-conscious policy

References

Further reading
 

Racism
Supreme Court of the United States
Politics and race